FC Karbach is a German association football club from the town of Karbach, Rhineland-Palatinate. The club's greatest success has been promotion to the tier five Oberliga Rheinland-Pfalz/Saar in 2015.

History
FC Karbach was formed in 1920 and initially played in the leagues of the Deutsche Jugendkraft, a catholic faith-based organisation. The club, from the start, played at the local Quintinsberg, still its home ground today, but then just a field covered in rocks and weeds. After the interruptions of the Second World War, during which the club did not field a team, it restarted after the war, playing in the tier five A-Klasse from 1951 until 1971. An era of lesser success followed with the team dropping down to the C-Klasse.

FC Karbach began to rise through the league system from 2005 onwards, achieving three consecutive league championships and promotions in the Kreisliga B, Kreisliga A and Bezirksliga. The latter took the club up to the tier six Rheinlandliga where it would play from 2008 to 2015. After finishing in the lower half of the table in its first two seasons there the club improved and finished runners up in 2013, followed by a league championship in 2015. The latter took the team up to the Oberliga Rheinland-Pfalz/Saar for 2015–16.

Honours
The club's honours:
 Rheinlandliga
 Champions: 2015
 Runners-up: 2013
 Bezirksliga Mitte
 Champions: 2008
 Kreisliga Hunsrück/Mosel A
 Champions: 2007
 Kreisliga Hunsrück/Mosel B
 Champions: 2006

Recent seasons
The recent season-by-season performance of the club:

 With the introduction of the Regionalligas in 1994 and the 3. Liga in 2008 as the new third tier, below the 2. Bundesliga, all leagues below dropped one tier.

References

External links
Official team site 
FC Karbach at Weltfussball.de 

Football clubs in Germany
Football clubs in Rhineland-Palatinate
Association football clubs established in 1920
1920 establishments in Germany